The Cajuapara River, also known as the Açailândia River, is a river of Maranhão state in northeastern Brazil. It joins with the Itinga River to form the Gurupí River, on the border with Pará state.

See also
List of rivers of Maranhão

References

Rivers of Maranhão